Asymmetricata humeralis, is a species of firefly beetle found in India and Sri Lanka.

Description
Dorsum with pale brown elytra with darker brown base and apex. Pronotum entirely pale yellow with paired median brown spots. In male, the aedeagal sheath tergite is emarginated on its right side, whereas the distal apex of the sheath sternite is obliquely truncate.

References 

Lampyridae
Insects of Sri Lanka
Insects described in 2019